Collio is a town and comune in the province of Brescia, in Lombardy, Italy. Neighbouring communes are Bagolino, Bienno, Bovegno, Lavenone, Marmentino, Pertica Alta and Pertica Bassa.

Twin towns
Collio is twinned with:

  Castroreale, Italy
  Gonnesa, Italy

Sources

Cities and towns in Lombardy